Luna Mystika is a Philippine television drama fantasy series broadcast by GMA Network. Directed by Michael Tuviera and Gil Tejada Jr., it stars Heart Evangelista and Mark Anthony Fernandez. It premiered on November 17, 2008 on the network's Telebabad line up replacing Codename: Asero. The series concluded on March 6, 2009 with a total of 80 episodes. It was replaced by All About Eve in its timeslot.

A sequel to the series, Luna Blanca was broadcast in 2012.
The series is streaming online on YouTube.

Cast and characters

Lead cast
 Heart Evangelista as Luna Sagrado-Samaniego / Celestina Sagrado
 Mark Anthony Fernandez as Dexter Samaniego

Supporting cast
 Vaness del Moral as Luna/Celestina Shadow
 Dante Rivero as Joaquin Sagrado / Agnon
 Chanda Romero as Benita Sagrado
 Sheryl Cruz as Alice Sagrado
 Romnick Sarmenta as Dominic Samaniego
 Rita Avila as Diana Sagrado
 Gardo Versoza as Dante / Sikano
 Ariel Rivera as Simon Samaniego / Ybarra Montecillo
 Iwa Moto as Donita Sagrado
 Luis Alandy as Andoy
 Kris Bernal as Malou
 Aljur Abrenica as Libado
 Hero Angeles as Alguwas
 Bearwin Meily as Bikodong
 John Lapus as Karya
 Mark Herras as Kamilo
 Michelle Madrigal as Anata
 Pauleen Luna as Adita
 Ces Quesada as Gina
 Mosang as Piryang
 Jade Lopez as Susing
 Paulo Avelino as Johnny
 Prince Stefan as Henry
 Jace Flores as Lucas

Recurring cast
 Jenny Miller as Aligwa
 Christian Vasquez as Milawon

Guest cast
 Beth Tamayo as Lanie Samaniego

Ratings
According to AGB Nielsen Philippines' Mega Manila household television ratings, the pilot episode of Luna Mystika earned a 38.9% rating. While the final episode scored a 37.3% rating.

Accolades

References

External links
 

2008 Philippine television series debuts
2009 Philippine television series endings
Fantaserye and telefantasya
Filipino-language television shows
GMA Network drama series
Television shows set in Metro Manila